The Modern Pagan movement in the United Kingdom is primarily represented by Wicca and Witchcraft religions, Druidry, and Heathenry. 74,631 people in England, Scotland and Wales identified as either as Pagan or a member of a specific Modern Pagan group in the 2011 UK Census.

Demographics
A study conducted by Ronald Hutton compared a number of different sources (including membership lists of major organisations within the United Kingdom, major events attendance, subscriptions to magazines, etc.), and used standard models for calculating likely numbers of Pagans within the United Kingdom. This estimate accounted for multiple membership overlaps as well as the number of adherents represented by each attendee of a Pagan gathering. Hutton estimated that there are 250,000 Pagan adherents in the United Kingdom, roughly equivalent to the national Hindu community back in 2001 when it was much smaller than it is today (there are presently over a million Hindus in the United Kingdom).

A smaller number is suggested by the results of the 2001 Census, in which a question about religious affiliation was asked for the first time. Respondents were able to write in an affiliation not covered by the check-list of common religions, and a total of 42,262 people from England, Scotland, and Wales declared themselves to be Pagans by this method (or 23% of the 179,000 adherents of "other religions" in the results). These figures were not released as a matter of course by the Office for National Statistics, but were released after an application filed by the Pagan Federation (Scottish branch). With a population of around 59 million, this gives a rough proportion of 7 Pagans per 10,000 inhabitants of the United Kingdom.

The 2001 UK Census figures did not allow an accurate breakdown of traditions within the Pagan heading, as a campaign by the Pagan Federation before the census encouraged Wiccans, Heathens, Druids and others all to use the same write-in term 'Pagan' in order to maximise the numbers reported. The 2011 census however made it possible to describe oneself as Pagan-Wiccan, Pagan-Druid and so on. The figures for England, Wales and Scotland are as follows:

The overall numbers of people reporting Pagan or one of the other categories in the table above rose between 2001 and 2011. In 2001 about seven people per 10,000 UK respondents identified as pagan; in 2011 the number (based on the England and Wales population) was 14.3 people per 10,000 respondents.

Research conducted by Dr Leo Ruickbie suggested that the south-east of England had the highest concentration of Pagans in the country.

Religions
Modern Paganism in the UK is dominated by Wicca, the modern movement of Druidry, and forms of Heathenry.

Wicca
Wicca was developed in England in the first half of the 20th century. It is generally a duotheistic religion which worships the Horned God and Moon Goddess. Although it had various terms in the past, from the 1960s onward the name of the religion was normalised to Wicca.

Heathenry

Heathenry consists of a variety of modern movements attempting to revive Germanic paganism, such as that practiced in the British Isles by the Anglo-Saxon and Scandinavian peoples prior to Christianisation. Asatru UK was founded in 2013 and operates as a country-wide group for all inclusive Heathens.

Druidism
During the Iron Age, Celtic polytheism was the predominant religion in the area now known as England. Neo-Druidism grew out of the Celtic revival in 18th century Romanticism. Its first organised group was the Ancient Order of Druids, founded in London in 1781 along Masonic lines as a mutual benefit society and still extant today. It is not a neo-Pagan group. It was followed in 1792 by the Gorsedd of Bards of the Isle of Britain, also founded in London. This was the brainchild of Welsh stonemason, student of Welsh language, culture and heritage, and literary forger, Edward Williams, better known by his assumed name, Iolo Morganwg. It also survives to this day, its rituals forming an important part of the annual Welsh National Eisteddfod. Its members included Queen Elizabeth II and former archbishop of Canterbury, Rowan Williams. It is a cultural institution, not a neo-Pagan one. Inasmuch as it has a religious element, that element is Christian. The Ancient Druid Order, founded circa 1909, was the first that could be characterised as neo-Pagan, its founder being influenced by the occult movement of the late 19th century. The Order of Bards, Ovates and Druids, which split from the Ancient Druid Order in 1964, began to develop a more neo-Pagan style of Druidry, partly through the friendship between its founder, Ross Nichols, and the founder of modern Wicca, Gerald Gardner. Nichols, however, was a Christian. More overtly Pagan Druid groups began to develop in the UK from the late 1970s onwards. These include the British Druid Order, The Druid Network and numerous other smaller groups.

Organisations 

Modern Pagan organisations in Great Britain:
 Heathenry
 Asatru UK (since 2013)
 Odinist Fellowship (since 1988)
 Odinic Rite (since 1973)
 Neo-druidism in Britain
 British Druid Order
 The Druid Network
 The Druid Order
 Order of Bards, Ovates and Druids
 Secular Order of Druids
 Other
Children of Artemis
 Pagan Dawn (magazine, since 1968)
 Pagan Federation (since 1971)
 Quest Conference
 Unitarian Earth Spirit Network (since 1990)
Pagan Federation
Scottish Pagan Federation

See also

British Traditional Wicca
New Age travellers
Religion in the United Kingdom

Notes

Footnotes

References
Hutton, Ronald (2001). The Triumph of the Moon: A History of Modern Pagan Witchcraft. .

 
Religion in the United Kingdom